Robert Daum (8 January 1889 – 6 May 1962) was a German politician of the Social Democratic Party (SPD) and former member of the German Bundestag.

Life 
In post-war Germany, he was a member of the North Rhine-Westphalia state parliament from 1946 to 1947 and of the Economic Council of the United Economic Area from 1948 to 1949. He sat in the 2nd German Bundestag from 1953 to 1957.

Literature

References

1889 births
1962 deaths
Members of the Bundestag for North Rhine-Westphalia
Members of the Bundestag 1953–1957
Members of the Bundestag for the Social Democratic Party of Germany
Members of the Landtag of North Rhine-Westphalia